The mesa shoulderband, scientific name Helminthoglypta coelata, is a species of air-breathing land snail, a terrestrial pulmonate gastropod mollusk in the family Helminthoglyptidae. This species is endemic to the United States and Baja California del Norte, Mexico.

References

Molluscs of the United States
Helminthoglypta
Gastropods described in 1916
Taxonomy articles created by Polbot